Guaratinga is a municipality in the state of Bahia in the North-East region of Brazil.

The municipality contains the  Alto Cariri National Park, created in 2010.

See also
List of municipalities in Bahia

References

Municipalities in Bahia